Clarence Oliver Gamble (August 16, 1881 – June 13, 1952) was an American tennis player who competed in the 1904 Summer Olympics.

In 1904 he won the bronze medal with his partner Arthur Wear in the doubles competition.

References

External links
 profile

1881 births
1952 deaths
American male tennis players
Olympic bronze medalists for the United States in tennis
Tennis players at the 1904 Summer Olympics
Place of birth missing
Medalists at the 1904 Summer Olympics